Robin Gurung (born 24 October 1992) is an Indian professional footballer who plays as a defender for Jamshedpur in the Indian Super League.

Career

ONGC
Gurung made his professional debut for ONGC in the I-League on 4 December 2010 in the first round of the 2010–11 season against East Bengal at the Salt Lake Stadium in Kolkata, ONGC lost 1–0. At the end of the season ONGC were relegated, however after a good showing in the 2012 I-League 2nd Division in which ONGC finished in 2nd place the club were back in the I-League.

Shillong Lajong
On 18 July 2013 it was confirmed that Gurung has signed for Shillong Lajong with one other player Vinay Singh. 
Gurung made his debut for Shillong Lajong in the I-League on 22 September 2013 against Dempo at the Duler Stadium in which he played the whole match; as Shillong Lajong won the match 0–3.

NorthEast United
Robin represented North East United FC in the 2014 Indian Super League and was a regular, playing as a Left Back and garnered praise for his sturdy displays and excellent one-on-one defending.

Jamshedpur
On 23 July 2017, Gurung was selected in the 5th round of the 2017–18 ISL Players Draft by Jamshedpur for the 2017–18 Indian Super League season. After not playing a single game during the ISL season, Gurung made his debut for Jamshedpur on 2 April 2018 in their Super Cup match against Minerva Punjab.

Career statistics

Club

References

External links

Indian footballers
1992 births
Living people
Footballers from Sikkim
Indian Gorkhas
I-League players
Shillong Lajong FC players
NorthEast United FC players
East Bengal Club players
Jamshedpur FC players
Indian Super League players
Association football fullbacks